Yamut is a village in Golestan Province, Iran.

Yamut may also refer to:
Nuri Yamut (1890-1961), Turkish general